Chowgan (also Romanized as Chowgān and Chugān; also known as Khūgān) is a village in Hamzehlu Rural District, in the Central District of Khomeyn County, Markazi Province, Iran. At the 2006 census, its population was 235, in 69 families.

References 

Populated places in Khomeyn County